George Who? (French: George qui?) is a 1973 French biographical film directed by Michèle Rosier and starring Anne Wiazemsky, Alain Libolt and Denis Gunsbourg. Philosopher Gilles Deleuze also featured in the film. The film depicts the life of the French author George Sand.

Partial cast
 Anne Wiazemsky as George Sand 
 Alain Libolt as Charles Fleury 
 Denis Gunsbourg as Casimir Dudevant 
 Geneviève Mnich as Ursule 
 Didier Flamand as Juste Olivier
 Jean-Gabriel Nordmann as Jules Sandeau 
 Claude Fagel as The fiddler / The watchman
 Bulle Ogier as Marie Dorval 
 Gilles Deleuze as Lamennais 
 Yves Rénier as Alfred de Musset 
 Jean-Michel Ribes as Pierre Leroux 
 Pierre Kalinovski as Frédéric Chopin
 Jean Benguigui as The musical critic

References

External links

1973 films
French biographical films
1970s French-language films
1970s biographical films
1970s French films